Alojzy Graj (12 December 1929 – 16 June 1983) was a Polish long-distance runner. He competed in the men's 5000 metres at the 1952 Summer Olympics.

References

1929 births
1983 deaths
Athletes (track and field) at the 1952 Summer Olympics
Polish male long-distance runners
Olympic athletes of Poland
People from Piła County
Sportspeople from Greater Poland Voivodeship
Zawisza Bydgoszcz athletes